Norma Muñoz is an American politician who served as a representative in the Arizona House of Representatives from 2014 to 2015. She was appointed unanimously by the Maricopa County Board of Supervisors on March 24, 2014, to fill the seat that was created when Ruben Gallego resigned to run for Congress. She lost the bid for reelection during the Democratic primary to Rebecca Rios.

References

External links

Living people
Women state legislators in Arizona
Hispanic and Latino American state legislators in Arizona
Hispanic and Latino American women in politics
Democratic Party members of the Arizona House of Representatives
21st-century American politicians
21st-century American women politicians
Politicians from Phoenix, Arizona
Year of birth missing (living people)